Andriani is a feminine given name and an Italian surname, it may refer to
Given name
Andriani (born 1995), Indonesian cricketer
Andriani Marshanda (born 1989), Indonesian actress, singer and television host

Surname
Maycol Andriani (born 1987), Italian footballer 
Oscar Andriani (1905–1987), Italian actor
Ottaviano Andriani (born 1974), Italian marathon runner

See also
Adriani (disambiguation)
Andrian (disambiguation)
Adrian

Italian-language surnames
Patronymic surnames